Life is an album by saxophonist David "Fathead" Newman, dedicated to pianist John Hicks, which was recorded in 2004 and released on the HighNote label the following year.

Reception

In his review on Allmusic, Thom Jurek states: "taste, elegance and soul are the trademarks of everything here. Indeed, as evidenced by Life, Newman's able to turn the trick back inside out and seek new ground inside ballads and standards rather than radically revisioning them. He has always been a player of great feeling and economy, but here, he takes his gifts to an entirely different level. Just beautiful". In JazzTimes, Owen Cordle noted: "David “Fathead” Newman, known for his gritty, Texas tenor solos with the Ray Charles band of the 1950s and ’60s, is also a compelling, sexy ballad player, as this album, his eighth for HighNote, reiterates ... Working with a tasteful, George Shearing Quintet-like rhythm section, Newman benefits from arrangements and colors that give the album classiness beyond a blowing session". On All About Jazz, Terrell Kent Holmes observed: "Even after decades in the music business, it's clear that David "Fathead Newman still has many, many notes left to play. Toward that end Life is a handful of chestnuts on which he displays his formidable triple-threat skills on tenor sax, alto sax and flute ... Newman's intelligence and experience are evident throughout Life, an album which exemplifies a relaxed and timeless excellence".

Track listing 
 "Girl Talk" (eal Hefti, Bobby Troup) – 6:11	
 "Life" (John Hicks) – 6:59
 "Alfie" (Burt Bacharach, Hal David) – 5:59
 "I Can't Get Started" (Vernon Duke, Ira Gershwin) – 6:14
 "Old Folks" (Willard Robison, Dedette Lee Hill) – 6:46	
 "Autumn in New York" (Vernon Duke) – 6:29
 "Come Sunday" (Duke Ellington) – 6:18
 "What a Wonderful World" (George Douglas, George David Weiss) – 7:29
 "Naima" (John Coltrane) – 6:42

Personnel 
David "Fathead" Newman – tenor saxophone, alto saxophone, flute
Steve Nelson – vibraphone
David Leonhardt – piano 
Peter Bernstein – guitar
John Menegon – bass 
Yoron Israel – drums

References 

David "Fathead" Newman albums
2007 albums
HighNote Records albums